Bakkes is a South African surname that may refer to
Christiaan Bakkes (born 1965), South African writer
C. Johan Bakkes (born 1956), South African writer, brother of Christiaan
Margaret Bakkes (1931–2016), South African writer, mother of Christiaan and C. Johan

See also
Bakke (surname)

Afrikaans-language surnames